Valentina Turkova is a retired Russian coxswain who won three medals at the European Rowing Championships between 1964 and 1966.

References

Year of birth missing (living people)
Living people
Russian female rowers
Soviet female rowers
Coxswains (rowing)
European Rowing Championships medalists